Wendy Kesselman is an American playwright.

Life
Wendy Kesselman came to the Actors Theater of Louisville in 1980.  She lives in Wellfleet, Massachusetts.

Awards
She won the 1981 Susan Smith Blackburn Prize, for My Sister in this House.

Works
Becca, 1977
, 1980
Merry-Go-Round, 1981
, 1981
I Love You, I Love You Not, 1982
, 1982
Cinderella In A Mirror, 1987
The Griffin, And The Minor Cannon, 1988
A Tale Of Two Cities, 1992
The Butcher's Daughter, 1993
Sand In My Shoes, 1995
The Diary of Anne Frank, 1997 (adaptation)
The Last Bridge, 2002

The Black Monk, 2008
Olympe And The Executioner

Film
 I Love You, I Love You Not, 1997
 Sister, My Sister, 1994

References

External links
Wendy Kesselman, doollee 
Charlie Rose Interview 
"Making Young Audiences Think: The Case for Playwright Wendy Kesselman", Lowell Swortzell, Youth Theatre Journal, v3 n4 p3-5 Spr 1989

American dramatists and playwrights
Living people
1940 births